Richard Grayson (born June 4, 1951, in Brooklyn, New York) is a writer, political activist and performance artist, most noted for his books of short stories and his satiric runs for public office.

Grayson's fiction is largely autobiographical, or pseudo-autobiographical.

Early career
Grayson was born in 1951 and attended New York public schools, graduating from Midwood High School in 1968. He attended Brooklyn College and received a B.A. in political science in 1973 and an M.F.A. in creative writing in 1976; Grayson also received an M.A. in English from Richmond College (now The College of Staten Island) in 1975. His stories began appearing in literary magazines in the mid-1970s, and in 1979, his first book-length collection of short stories, With Hitler in New York, was published.
In the same year Grayson registered with the Federal Election Commission (FEC) as a candidate for Vice President of the United States, receiving coverage for his humorous "campaign".

By 1979, Grayson had over 125 stories published in magazines and anthologies.  He remained a prolific writer in the early 1980s, when several short story collections came out in quick succession: Lincoln's Doctor's Dog (1982), Eating at Arby's (1982), and I Brake for Delmore Schwartz (1983).  Most of these stories originally appeared in journals such as Transatlantic Review, Texas Quarterly, California Quarterly, and Epoch.

In 1981, Grayson received a $3,000 grant from the Florida Fine Arts Council for his fiction. In 1988, Grayson received a writer-in-residence award for from the New York State Council on the Arts to be the writer-in-residence at the Rockland Arts Center in West Nyack, New York. Grayson also won a $5,000 fellowship in literature/fiction from the Florida Division of Cultural Affairs in 1998.

Also in 1981, Grayson began a series of what he termed "publicity art," getting media attention for creating a fan club and fan magazine for his grandmother and starting a campaign to draft Burt Reynolds as a Republican candidate for the U.S. Senate from Florida. Grayson also filed a political action committee to draft Ruhollah Khomeini of Iran to run for the U.S. House of Representatives from Brooklyn in order to "neutralize" the Ayatollah during the Iran hostage crisis, saying that if elected, "Khomeini would be as ineffective as any other congressman."

Political activity
In 1982, Grayson ran for a seat on the Davie, Florida, town council on a platform advocating that the town's numerous horses be given the right to vote. He also suggested that Davie could gain more aid from the federal government by seceding from the U.S. and becoming a foreign country, "especially if we threaten to turn Communist." A Miami Herald editorial endorsed his opponent, calling Grayson's candidacy "some kind of wry joke." Upon learning that he had received only 25% of the vote, Grayson announced that he was moving to the neighboring city of Sunrise, saying Davie residents "won't have Dick Grayson to kick around anymore."

In 1983, Grayson filed with the Federal Election Commission (FEC) to run for President of the United States in 1984 as a Democrat. Over the next year, the exploits in his humorous campaign to replace President Ronald Reagan were widely covered in the media. Perhaps his best-known remark, quoted in Time, USA Today, and The Wall Street Journal, was his explanation of why he asked the actress Jane Wyman, star of the then-current nighttime soap opera Falcon Crest and the former wife of the incumbent president, to be his vice presidential running mate: "She already has experience in dumping Ronald Reagan." As an alternative vice presidential candidate, Grayson favored Meryl Streep because he liked the sound of "Streep for Veep." Grayson said he would appoint Donna Summer as Secretary of Labor because "she works hard for the money." Other platform planks in the Grayson campaign included making El Salvador the 51st state and moving the U.S. capital to Davenport, Iowa.

In November 1983, Grayson took part in a series of debates with other minor presidential candidates at shopping malls in Florida.

A few months later, in January 1984, while an instructor of English at Broward Community College, Grayson sent a questionnaire to Florida state senators for a survey he was conducting called "Legislators in Love," implying that state funds were used in his academic research.

In 1986, Grayson, then 34, filed an age discrimination complaint with the Broward County Human Relations Division after he was denied a senior citizen account featuring free checking at AmeriFirst Federal Savings and Loan Association. The division dismissed the case after Grayson refused a settlement that would be kept secret,  but Grayson claimed he had proved his point that discounts should be based on need, not age.

Also in 1986, after Grayson filed a political action committee to draft Claus von Bülow to run in that year's U.S. Senate election in New York, von Bülow said he had no intention to run for any political office and was "not an American subject."

In the 1988 presidential primary in Florida, when "Undecided" was an option on the ballot, Grayson created an organization, Florida Democrats for Undecided, to promote that option. "Undecided" won 6.2% of the vote, finishing ahead of three of the seven presidential candidates on the ballot.

To help raise money for the financially struggling Donald Trump in 1990, Grayson, with "tongue firmly in cheek," created the Trump Rescue Fund in 1990, soliciting money for the billionaire on the streets of New York, though a Trump Tower employee shooed Grayson and his hand-lettered flyers away from the building. Later in 1990, as the economy faltered, Grayson appeared on CNN touting Pauper, a magazine featuring "articles about poor celebrities, bankrupt businesses, failed financial institutions, [and] tips on frugal living." A "Pauper 400" list would "answer the lists of the super-rich in 'wealth-oriented magazines.'"

In September 1991, Grayson spoke at a public hearing of the Florida Redistricting Commission, showing his drawings of legislative districts configured like a palm tree, the Space Shuttle, the sun, a boat and an alligator, saying that districts in recognizable shapes would get more voters interested in state government.

During the 1994 elections, upset at how many Republican U.S. House members of Florida were unopposed by Democrats, Grayson filed with the Division of Elections as a write-in candidate to run against Representative Michael Bilirakis in Florida's 9th congressional district in the Tampa Bay area although Grayson lived outside the district, in Gainesville. Despite naming his political campaign committee "God Hates Republicans," Grayson received only 157 write-in votes.

In the 1996 election, Grayson filed as a write-in candidate against Rep. Ileana Ros-Lehtinen, a Republican who was otherwise unopposed in the Miami-based 18th congressional district.
 
For the 2004 elections, Grayson again filed to run as a write-in candidate in the election against an otherwise unopposed Florida Republican U.S. House member, Ander Crenshaw. After winning the endorsement of John B. Anderson, an independent candidate for president in 1980, Grayson told Broward Palm Beach New Times, "What I'm doing now is not quite a joke...I'm trying to make a point. In Florida, we have a system where, if one candidate files for an office and no other candidate files, then there's no election." In the conservative 4th congressional district in northern Florida, Grayson supported legal recognition of same-sex marriage, socialized medicine, a $10 an hour minimum wage, repeal of President George W. Bush's tax cuts, and immediate withdrawal of U.S. troops from Iraq; Grayson did not set foot in the district until October 2, 2004, when he did a television spot at a Jacksonville CBS affiliate. Grayson received less than 1% of the vote.

Grayson became the Green Party nominee for Arizona's 6th congressional district in the 2010 election after winning the party's primary with six write-in votes. The Green Party sued Grayson and other party nominees, claiming they were "sham" candidates who should be removed from the November ballot. A federal judge ruled in favor of Grayson and other Green Party primary winners.

Grayson ran for president again in the 2012 election, this time in the Green Party's Arizona presidential primary and was endorsed by the Tucson Weekly, which noted "we have been most impressed with Richard Grayson, including his plan to deport Republicans back to the 18th century, where they could be more comfortable with their tricorner hats and other Tea Party garb, and his demand that Pinal County Sheriff Paul Babeu be nicer to his ex-boyfriends." In a field of six candidates, Grayson finished in a tie for third place, with 39 votes.

Later in 2012, Grayson changed his voter registration to the new Americans Elect party and in the primary, he won the party's nomination for Congress against incumbent Republican Paul Gosar in Arizona's 4th congressional district. Grayson finished fourth in the general election, receiving 1% of the vote in November 2012.

In the 2014 election, running unopposed, Grayson won the Democratic nomination for Wyoming's at-large congressional district. When Grayson ran as a "hip-hop candidate," with a campaign committee called PPLZ 4 GRAYSON CREW, the head of the Wyoming Democratic party said of his campaign, "I am not thrilled with it." The only endorsement Grayson received came from United Auto Workers. In November 2014, Grayson garnered 23% of the vote running against Republican Congresswoman Cynthia Lummis. Despite not campaigning, spending any money, or visiting Wyoming, Grayson managed to beat Lummis 46% to 43% in Teton County. For the 2016 election, he filed to run again for Congress in Wyoming, but quit when a local Democrat entered the race.

Grayson won another Green Party primary in 2018, this time for the election for state representative in Arizona's 16th legislative district. When no Democrat filed to oppose Kelly Townsend for state senator in the same district in the 2020 election, Grayson filed as a write-in candidate “for those Democrats and others who hate Trump Republicans.”

In 2022, with no Democrat on the ballot in Arizona's 9th congressional district, Grayson ran a write-in campaign against incumbent Republican U.S. Representative Paul Gosar, receiving 3,531 votes to Gosar's 192,976 votes.

Social activism and writing

Grayson's experience as a lawyer and gay activist informed some of the stories in his 1996 collection, I Survived Caracas Traffic, whose title story Kirkus Reviews called "a resonant meditation on the themes of relationships, AIDS, and mortality." Another story in the same volume is "Twelve Step Barbie," which, along with "With Hitler in New York" is probably the author's best-known work and the subject of academic criticism. The New York Times Book Review called the book "far too bright and keenly made to flick casually away.

In New York in June 1990, Grayson created Radio Free Broward, a service to mail copies of the 2 Live Crew album As Nasty as They Wanna Be to residents of South Florida, where a federal judge had ruled it obscene and where a record store owner was arrested for selling it. Grayson attended the Fort Lauderdale obscenity trials related to the album the following autumn and winter.

Other tongue-in-cheek campaigns initiated by Grayson include warning Americans to keep their pets indoors to keep the Skylab satellite from falling on them and a drive for a constitutional amendment to ban bra burning, satirizing those who favored a flag desecration amendment.

As a staff attorney in social policy at the Center for Governmental Responsibility at the University of Florida law school, Grayson began writing op-ed columns for various Florida newspapers opposing proposed laws limiting the rights of gay speakers on college campuses, reinstating chain gangs in prisons, charging lottery winners for past welfare payments, and randomly testing students in middle and high school students for drugs, along with Florida's then-existing ban on adoptions by LGBT parents.

In addition to teaching at Broward Community College, Grayson has taught at Long Island University, Brooklyn College, Kingsborough Community College and The School of Visual Arts in New York; Santa Fe Community College, Florida Atlantic University and Nova Southeastern University in Florida; and Arizona State University and Mesa Community College in Arizona. He has also led workshops at writers' conference, including those at Winthrop College (now Winthrop University) and Francis Marion College (now Francis Marion University) in South Carolina.

Grayson has held residencies at several artists' colonies, including  MacDowell, the Virginia Center for the Creative Arts, Ragdale, the Montalvo Arts Center and the Ucross Foundation.

Recent work
Grayson originally published some of the gay-themed stories in The Silicon Valley Diet on early internet sites that featured short fiction. In 2004 he appeared in various literary webzines with his memoirs, satire, and stories. His "Diary of a Congressional Candidate in Florida's Fourth Congressional District," a recurring feature on the website of McSweeney's, covered his 2004 campaign as the sole opponent to Rep. Crenshaw.

More recently, Grayson published two short story collections almost simultaneously. The more experimental book was Highly Irregular Stories (2006), which Kirkus called "an eclectic anthology of intriguing short stories...Grayson’s stories here recall no one so much as Richard Brautigan, who walked a similar line between wit and warmth in his more eccentric novels." In its review of the book, Hipster Book Club said, "The funny stuff in Highly Irregular Stories is not just mildly amusing but actually laugh-out-loud funny."

The second volume, And to Think That He Kissed Him on Lorimer Street (2006), which Kirkus termed "[a] funny, odd, somehow familiar and fully convincing fictional world," featured more representational and autobiographical stories, set mostly in Brooklyn.

In 2008, Grayson self-published a book featuring some uncollected stories from three decades under the title Who Will Kiss the Pig?: Sex Stories for Teens. Kirkus called the book “[f]unny, pleasurable and often prescient short fiction that delivers many more hits than misses,” but most of the media attention came from Gawker and Gothamist after Grayson placed a Craigslist ad that began, “Cool Brooklyn book publisher looking for cool 18-25yo hipsters to blurb our cool forthcoming book of sex stories for teens.”

In 2009, Grayson's writing also appeared in the anthology Life As We Show It: Writing on Film and the chapbooks The Tao Shoplifting Crisis and I Hate All of You on This L Train.

When Martha Stewart was indicted in 2003, Grayson launched the Martha Stewart Legal Defense Fund to raise money for her, saying "My life was changed by her. I basically used to be a slob."

In a satirical response to a 2011 edition of Mark Twain's "The Adventures of Huckleberry Finn" published by NewSouth Books, which replaced the word "nigger" with "slave"  to make the novel more "classroom-friendly," Grayson published "The Hipster Huckleberry Finn," which is an edition with the word "nigger" replaced with the word "hipster" in order, he claimed, to make Huck's adventures "neither offensive nor uncool."

In 2012, Thought Catalog published "An 18-Year-Old's Diary Entries from August, 1969," purporting to be from Grayson's actual diary. In the next eight years, over 600 more posts followed, all supposedly from Grayson's diary, ending in August 1988. In a 2015 interview, Grayson claimed to have written a continuous diary since 1969.

While the Dictionary of Literary Biography has called Grayson "a marginal figure in contemporary American fiction," it also noted that "he and his fictional persona seem quite aware of this fact" and that "taken as a body of work, Grayson's short fiction ultimately appears to be one ongoing, career-long writing project, focused always on the effects of contemporary culture on the self."

References

1951 births
Living people
People from Brooklyn
American LGBT rights activists
University of Florida alumni
Activists from New York (state)
Midwood High School alumni
Brooklyn College alumni